Thompsonville is a village in Cave Township, Franklin County, Illinois, United States. The population was 543 at the 2010 census.

History 
There was an early settlement started in the general vicinity called "Jordan's Settlement". It was founded in 1811.

Geography
Thompsonville is located in southeastern Franklin County at  (37.916443, -88.761564). Illinois Route 34 passes through the village, leading northwest  to Benton, the county seat, and southeast  to Harrisburg. Illinois Route 149 leads west from Thompsonville  to West Frankfort.

Demographics

At the 2000 census there were 571 people, 222 households, and 166 families in the village. The racial makeup of the village was 98.77% White, 0.35% Native American, and 0.88% from two or more races. Hispanic or Latino of any race were 0.70%.

Of the 222 households 32.9% had children under the age of 18 living with them, 61.3% were married couples living together, 10.8% had a female householder with no husband present, and 25.2% were non-families. 21.2% of households were one person and 9.0% were one person aged 65 or older.  The average household size was 2.57 and the average family size was 2.96.

The age distribution was 23.5% under the age of 18, 9.8% from 18 to 24, 31.0% from 25 to 44, 20.5% from 45 to 64, and 15.2% 65 or older.  The median age was 38 years. For every 100 females, there were 95.5 males.  For every 100 females age 18 and over, there were 94.2 males.

The median household income was $30,500 and the median family income  was $33,750. Males had a median income of $25,563 versus $17,656 for females. The per capita income for the village was $13,327.  About 14.0% of families and 17.8% of the population were below the poverty line, including 25.2% of those under age 18 and 12.3% of those age 65 or over.

References

Villages in Franklin County, Illinois
Villages in Illinois
Populated places in Southern Illinois